The 1955 National League Division Two was the tenth post-war season of the second tier of motorcycle speedway in Great Britain.

Summary
The only change in the list of teams that finished the previous season was the replacement of Motherwell Eagles with Weymouth Scorchers. Poole Pirates won the title.

Weymouth Scorchers withdrew after 7 league fixtures, Bristol Bulldogs withdrew after 14.

Final table

Weymouth Scorchers and Bristol Bulldogs withdrew, records expunged.

Top Five Riders (League only)

National Trophy Stage One
 For Stage Two - see Stage Two
The 1955 National Trophy was the 18th edition of the Knockout Cup. The Trophy consisted of two stages; stage one was for the second tier clubs, stage two was for the top tier clubs. Poole won stage one and qualified for second and final stage.

Division Two First round

Division Two Second round

Division Two semifinals

Division Two final
First leg

Second leg

See also
List of United Kingdom Speedway League Champions

References

Speedway National League Division Two
Speedway National League Division Two
1955 in speedway